Alper is a male Turkish given name. It is composed of the two words alp and er. In Turkish, "Alp" means "Stouthearted", "Brave", "Chivalrous", "Daredevil", and/or "Valorous". The second, er means soldier or male. Additionally Alper is used as an adjective for an ancient legendary Turkish commander; Alp Er Tunga who lived around 300 B.C.
It's meant to be a good hearted one too.
From the same Asian cultural roots, Alper is closely related to name 勇士 (Japanese yuushi, Chinese yǒngshì) derived 勇 =Alp and 士 =Er words.

Given name
 Alper Akçam (born 1987), Turkish-German footballer
 Alper Bagceci (born 1984), Turkish-German footballer
 Alper Balaban (born 1987), Turkish-German footballer
 Alper Görmüş (born 1952), Turkish journalist and writer
 Alper Kalemci (born 1991), Turkish footballer
 Alper Potuk (born 1991), Turkish footballer
 Alper Saruhan (born 1982), Turkish basketball players
 Alper Sendilmen (born 1980), Turkish-German rapper
 Alper Sezener (born 1977), Turkish author
 Alper Uçar (born 1985), Turkish figure skater
 Alper Uludağ (born 1990), Turkish footballer
 Alper Yılmaz (born 1975), Turkish basketball player

Surname
 Andrew Alper, former President of the New York City Economic Development Corporation (NYCEDC)
 Arthur Alper (born 1928), American volleyball player 
 Bob Alper, author, stand-up comedian, and practicing clergy member
 Bud Alper (1930–2012), American sound engineer 
 Chloe Alper, British singer-songwriter
 Howard Alper (born 1941), Canadian chemist
 Jonathan Alper (1950–1990), American actor and theatre director 
 Joseph Alper (born 1946), American chemist
 Murray Alper (1904–1984), American actor
 Martin Alper, video game designer
 Özcan Alper (born 1975), Turkish film director and screenwriter.
 Sam Alper (1924–2002), English caravan designer and manufacturer
 Steven M. Alper, music composer
 Tikvah Alper (1909-1995), South-African radiobiologist 

Turkish masculine given names